Lolco Airport ,  is an airstrip in the eastern mountains of the La Araucanía Region of Chile. The airstrip is on the Lolco River, a small tributary of Ralco Lake.

There is rising and mountainous terrain in all quadrants.

See also

Transport in Chile
List of airports in Chile

References

External links
OpenStreetMap - Lolco
OurAirports - Lolco
FallingRain - Lolco Airport

Airports in Chile
Airports in La Araucanía Region